The following is a list of stops on NYC Ferry.

Stops

Stops on multiple routes

Pier 11/Wall Street

Pier 11/Wall Street is the terminal for all NYC Ferry routes, except for the St. George and South Brooklyn lines. The pier has five berths each with two ferry slips, and is also used by NY Waterway, New York Water Taxi, SeaStreak, and tour boats.

East 34th Street

East 34th Street Ferry Landing is served by the Astoria, East River, Soundview, and Lower East Side lines. The landing is also used by New York Water Taxi and SeaStreak as well as event ferries to Yankee Stadium, Randall's Island, and Citi Field.

DUMBO

Located at the foot of Fulton Street, at the former Fulton Ferry landing, adjacent to Brooklyn Bridge Park's Pier 1. DUMBO is served by the East River and South Brooklyn routes.

Governors Island

This stop is served by the Governors Island Ferry shuttle during summer weekends only, and the South Brooklyn route at all times (except when the Governors Island shuttle is running). Prior to 2019, the East River and South Brooklyn ferries were extended from Wall St to Governors Island during summer weekends, before being replaced by the Governors Island shuttle in 2019. The South Brooklyn route was rerouted to serve Governors Island again between Red Hook & Sunset Park at all times except when the Governors Island shuttle is running.

Sunset Park

Located at the Brooklyn Army Terminal in Sunset Park, Brooklyn. Served by the South Brooklyn and Rockaway routes.

The landing was rebuilt and opened in 2018, with an all new waiting area.

East 90th Street

This stop was opened along with the Soundview line in August 2018. The Astoria route was extended to end at East 90th St on August 22, 2020.

Astoria route

Astoria

The Astoria terminal is located in Hallets Cove between the Astoria Houses public housing project and Socrates Sculpture Park. Long Island City Community Boathouse runs an introductory kayaking program in the cove, and objected to the placement of the ferry terminal.

Roosevelt Island

Located underneath the Queensboro Bridge, NYC Ferry is one of three public transit options connecting Roosevelt Island with Manhattan, the other two being the F train and the Roosevelt Island Tramway.

Long Island City

The Long Island City Ferry Terminal is located at the north end of Gantry Plaza State Park. It is served by the Astoria route in both directions.

Brooklyn Navy Yard

The Brooklyn Navy Yard Ferry Terminal is located at Dock 72 in the Brooklyn Navy Yard, and opened on May 21, 2019. It is served by the Astoria route in both directions.

Nearby, connections are available to the B67 bus within the Navy Yard, and the B57, B62, and B69 buses along Flushing Avenue.

East River Ferry

Hunters Point South

Located south of Long Island City in Hunters Point South, it became the northern terminal of the East River line on November 2, 2020.

Greenpoint

Located on the India Street Pier at 10 India Street in Greenpoint, Brooklyn along the East River. Served only by the East River route.
In late May 2021, structural problems were identified and the stop has been closed indefinitely until further notice.

North Williamsburg

South Williamsburg

South Brooklyn route

Corlears Hook

Corlears Hook is the northern terminal of the South Brooklyn line of the NYC Ferry system. Located at Corlears Hook Park and near Grand St, it is served by the South Brooklyn line at all times except late nights.

The stop opened along with the completion of the Lower East Side line to Long Island City on August 29, 2018. It was originally served by the Lower East Side route in both directions between August 29, 2018 and May 18, 2020. The next northbound stop was Stuyvesant Cove, with the next southbound stop being Wall St, the last stop.

On May 18, 2020, the Lower East Side route was discontinued, and service at this stop was replaced by an extended South Brooklyn route, which became its northern terminal. However, uptown service was not restored as a part of this service change.

Atlantic Avenue

Red Hook

The Red Hook Terminal is located in the Atlantic Basin next door to the Brooklyn Cruise Terminal.

Bay Ridge
Bay Ridge is the southern terminal of the South Brooklyn line of the NYC Ferry system. Located on the north end of the 69th Street Pier in Bay Ridge, Brooklyn along the Verrazano Narrows, it is served by the South Brooklyn line at all times except late nights.

The stop opened along with the completion of the original South Brooklyn line to Wall St/Pier 11 on July 1, 2017. It currently serves as the southern terminal of the South Brooklyn line.

In 2019, as part of a service expansion announcement, it was announced by NYC Ferry that a new route, called the Coney Island route, would open in 2021 and operate from Wall St/Pier 11 to Coney Island, with an intermediate stop at Bay Ridge. As a part of this change, Bay Ridge would no longer be the southern terminal of the South Brooklyn line, with service being replaced by the Coney Island route.

Rockaway route

Rockaway

Located on the north side of Rockaway Park in Jamaica Bay. Served only by the Rockaway route, however the ferry terminal also has shuttle buses towards Edgemere to the east, and Jacob Riis Park to the west.

Soundview route

Soundview

Located at the south east end of Classon Point park, it opened as part of the Soundview line in August 2018. It is currently the northern terminal of the Soundview Line. The Bx27 bus stops near the street loop on the north side of the street.

Stuyvesant Cove

Located at Stuyvesant Town on 23rd Street, it originally opened as part of the Lower East Side line in August 2018. When the Lower East Side line was discontinued, it was added as a stop to the Soundview line on May 18, 2020.

Coney Island route

Coney Island

This stop will serve as the southern terminal of the Coney Island line and will open in 2021.

St. George route

St. George

This stop serves as the southern terminus of the St. George route. It was recently open in late August of 2021.

References

https://www.ferry.nyc/routes-and-schedules/

Ferry terminals in Manhattan
Transportation buildings and structures in Manhattan